Leucine rich repeat and Ig domain containing 2 is a protein that in humans is encoded by the LINGO2 gene.

References

Further reading 

 
 
 
 
 
 

Genes on human chromosome 9